The Mayor of Pichilemu is an elected politician who is the head of the executive branch of government of the commune of Pichilemu, Libertador General Bernardo O'Higgins Region, Chile. The mayor presides over the local city council, composed of six members, and serves as the civic representative of the commune. The mayor is popularly elected in a municipal election, by simple majority. The office is held for a four-year term without term limits.

Forty different individuals, including acting mayors, have held the office of mayor since the commune of Pichilemu was created in December 1891. José María Caro Martínez, elected in 1894, was the inaugural mayor of the commune, and served for almost four consecutive terms, interrupted by his resignation in 1905. The current mayor is independent Cristian Pozo Parraguez, who was elected in May 2021 and took office on that 28 June.

Some mayors are particularly notable, for example: Conservative José María Caro Martínez (1830–1916), father of José María Caro Rodríguez, the first Chilean Cardinal of the Roman Catholic Church; Radical Carlos Rojas Pavez, the founder of Pichilemu, a newspaper which counted with collaborations of local journalist and historian José Arraño Acevedo and municipal worker Miguel Larravide Blanco; and Christian Democrat Jorge Vargas González (b. 1967), a politician who was forced out of office in two different times, under charges of bribery.

Background, organisation, and elections
On 22 December 1891, President Jorge Montt and his Minister of the Interior Manuel Irarrázabal Larraín promulgated the Autonomous Commune Law (Ley de Comuna Autónoma), creating 195 communes, including that of Pichilemu. At the time, the territory of Pichilemu comprised the former subdelegations of Cáhuil, Peñablanca, and Cocauquén. Three years later, on 6 May 1894, Pichileminians formed the first local government. José María Caro Martínez was elected the first mayor of the commune on that day.

Organisationally, the commune of Pichilemu has a mayor–council form of government. This provides for a commune-wide elected mayor serving in an executive role, as well as a city council serving in a legislative role. The mayor, as the highest authority of the commune of Pichilemu, has the responsibility to direct, manage and supervise the work of the municipality, and legally represents the commune. The mayor is also responsible for administrating the commune's financial resources, and municipal and national goods of public use, presides the local city council, and has the power to delegate his work to other functionaries of the local government, which he may appoint. Additionally, the mayor may give a public account of his gesture to the city council every year, usually in April; an extract of his account may be published to the community. If the mayor dies in office, resigns, or is unable to carry out his/her duties, a councilor may be elected by the city council to replace the former mayor. In the meantime, the municipal secretary may take office as acting mayor. This has happened several times in Pichilemu: following the resignation of René Maturana Maldonado in April 1992, municipal secretary Gustavo Parraguez Galarce took over his office since, at the time, there were no councilors; in November 1998, mayor Jorge Vargas González was convicted of illegally giving a driver's license, and the city council chose councilor Carlos Leyton Labarca until Vargas González resumed his duties in November 1999.

Municipal elections, during which mayors are elected, take place every four years; they take place one year before presidential elections (since 2008) in the last Sunday of October. Candidates must comply a number of requisites in order to run for mayor of Pichilemu; those include: to have completed secondary education (Enseñanza Media), to be a citizen, literate, to have resided in the Libertador General Bernardo O'Higgins Region for at least two years before the election, and to have their military status regularized. The mayor is usually sworn in on 6 December following the election. The next election for the mayor will be in 2016. Municipal elections originally elected three mayors, called primer, segundo, and tercer alcalde, and a number of regidores. For example, the results of the first elections in Pichilemu, for the term between 1894 and 1897, showed José María Caro Martínez, Pedro Nolasco de Mira, and Francisco Reyes elected as the first primer, segundo, and tercer alcalde of Pichilemu, respectively. The role of the primer alcalde equals that of the current mayor of Pichilemu. However, voting was not popular: only taxpayers and landowners could vote. According to the Decree #5655 of 4 December 1945, regidores were popularly elected, and they had the faculty to vote for the mayor that would rule for the local government three-year term. The 1973 Chilean coup d'état interrupted Washington Saldías Fuentealba's mayoral term, hence terminating possibilities of new elections. The military regime of Augusto Pinochet appointed seven mayors, who held the office in a period of nineteen years. Following the Chilean transition to democracy, the D'Hondt method of proportional representation was used in the municipal elections of 1992, 1996, and 2000: all candidates run in a single list, the most voted candidate becomes the mayor and other five/six become councilors, according to the aforementioned method. For the municipal elections beginning in 2004, candidates for mayor and councilor run in separate lists, and mayors are elected by simple majority of votes.

Mayors
To date, forty-two different individuals have served as mayor of the commune of Pichilemu. There have been 43 mayoralties, excluding those of acting mayors. Francisco Javier Asalgado, Sergio Morales Retamal, and Carlos Echazarreta Iñiguez have served two non-consecutive terms, while Felipe Iturriaga Esquivel served for three. The longest term was that of Roberto Córdova Carreño, who served between December 2008 and June 2021, over twelve years. Before Córdova, the longest term was that of José María Caro Martínez, who served eleven years until his resignation one year before his fourth term expired. The shortest term was that of Gustavo Parraguez Galarce, an acting mayor who served only six days between 6 December and 12 December 2008, before the city council elected Roberto Córdova Carreño as the successor of Marcelo Cabrera Martínez, who was under trial at the time. Excluding Parraguez Galarce, the shortest term of a mayor of Pichilemu was that of Osvaldo Sotomayor Ilabaca, which lasted a span of nine days, between 25 February and 6 March 1935. Only one mayor has died in office: Serafín López Lizana died after serving five months as mayor of the commune. Olga Maturana Espinosa is the only woman to have served as mayor.

Timeline
The timeline shows changes of the head of the executive branch of the municipality of Pichilemu from its creation in May 1894 until today.

1894–1950

1950–2000

2000–2020

2021–present

Latest election

See also

 Government of Pichilemu
 Governor of Cardenal Caro

Notes

References 
General

 
 
 
 
 
 

Specific

External links

 Website of the Municipality of Pichilemu

 
Government of Pichilemu
History of Pichilemu
Pichilemu
Articles which contain graphical timelines